FRR may refer to:

Organizations

Sport 
 Forza Rossa Racing, a Romanian racing team
 Furniture Row Racing, an American racing team
 Romanian Rugby Federation

Other organizations
 Falls Road Railroad, in New York, United States
 Federația Română de Radioamatorism, an amateur radio organization in Romania
 Fresh Air (airline), a Nigerian airline
 Pensions Reserve Fund (France)

Other uses 
 Flight Readiness Review, in the US military acquisition life cycle
 Forgiveness Rock Record, an album by Canadian indie rock band Broken Social Scene
 Free Radical Research, a peer-reviewed academic journal
 Front Royal–Warren County Airport, in Virginia, United States
 FRRouting, a network routing software suite
 North Frisian language (ISO 639 language code frr)
 Pays de la Loire, France